Rugged is a 2019 Indian Kannada-language romantic action film written and directed by Mahesh Gowda and produced by Arun Kumar A. The film caption is "Neenu Malagisiruva Goriyolage Nanninu Jeevathavagiddene". 
This Movie was launched in November 2017 

The project marks the first in the combination of Mahesh Gowda, Vinod Prabhakar and producer Arun Kumar A.

Cast

 Vinod Prabhakar
 Chaithra Reddy

Soundtrack

Reception

References

External links
 

2019 films
2010s Kannada-language films
Indian romantic action films
2010s masala films
Films scored by Abhimann Roy